The 2001 Wokingham District Council election took place on 7 June 2001 to elect members of Wokingham Unitary Council in Berkshire, England. One third of the council was up for election and the council stayed under no overall control.

The previous election in 2000 saw both the Conservatives and Liberal Democrats win 27 seats. The Liberal Democrats took control of the administration 2 months later after one of the Conservative councillors, Nigel Rose, abstained enabling the Liberal Democrats to get the mayor's casting vote.

The results of the 2001 election saw no change with both main parties remaining on the same number of seats. Overall turnout was significantly increased at 63.75% due to the election being held at the same time as the 2001 general election.

After the election, the composition of the council was:
Conservative 27
Liberal Democrat 27

Election result

Ward results

References

2001 English local elections
2001
2000s in Berkshire
June 2001 events in the United Kingdom